Lupherites is an extinct genus from a well-known class of fossil cephalopods, the ammonites. It lived during the Bajocian, which lasted from approximately 170.3 to 168.3 million years ago.

References

Jurassic ammonites